The Crazy Countess is a 1928 German silent film directed by Richard Löwenbein and starring Ralph Arthur Roberts, Werner Fuetterer, and Hanni Weisse. It was based on an operetta of the same title.

The film's art direction was by Max Heilbronner.

Cast

References

Bibliography

External links

1928 films
Films of the Weimar Republic
Films directed by Richard Löwenbein
German silent feature films
Films based on operettas
German black-and-white films